Chokalinga Chittibabu, commonly known as  Mayor Chittibabu, was an Indian politician and former Member of Parliament elected from Tamil Nadu. He was elected to the Lok Sabha from Chengalpattu constituency as a Dravida Munnetra Kazhagam candidate in 1967 and 1971 elections. He was first elected to the Madras Corporation in 1958 and was the Mayor of Madras in 1965. He was arrested under the Maintenance of Internal Security Act after Indira Gandhi declared emergency and the DMK government was dismissed in 1976. He was jailed along with DMK leaders and died of injuries due to police torture suffered while trying to save M.K. Stalin in Madras Central Prison.

References

External links
Official biographical sketch in Parliament of India website
M..K Stalin Prison Life

Dravida Munnetra Kazhagam politicians
India MPs 1967–1970
India MPs 1971–1977
Lok Sabha members from Tamil Nadu
Mayors of Chennai
1935 births
1977 deaths
People from Viluppuram district
People from Kanchipuram district